This is a list of towns and villages in Egypt. There are 4,496 village municipalities and 199 town municipalities.

A

Abd El Gilil
Abnub
Abu Durba
Abu Ghusun
Abu Haggag
Abu Hammad
Abu Hummus
Abu Kabir
Abu Mena
Abu Minqar
Abu Nusf
Abu Qurqas
Abu Rudeis
Abu Sidhum
Abu Tartur
Abu Tig
Abu Tisht
Abu Uwaijilah
Abu Zenima
Abukir
Ad-Daba
Ad-Dabiya
Ad-Dair
Adabiya
Aga
Agami
Ageeba 
Ain as-Sillin
Ain Furtaga
Ain Khudra
Ain Ris
Ain Sheikh Marzo
Ain Sukhna
Ain Umm Achmed
Akhmim
Al Matariya
Al-Amiriya
Al-Aqaba al-Kabira
Al-Arish
Al-Atamina
Al-Ayyat
Al-Badari
Al-Ballas
Al-Balyana
Al-Birba
Al-Burj
Al-Burumbul
Al-Fant
Al-Fashn
Al-Feiran
Al-Gharaq
Al-Hammam
Al-Hamrawayn
Al-Hamul
Al-Harra
Al-Hawamidiya
Al-Hindaw
Al-Husainiya
Al-Jarawla
Al-Kilh Gharb
Al-Kuntilla
Al-Kushh
Al-Maadi
Al-Madina al-Fakriya
Al-Mahalla al Kubra
Amrit
An-Nasr
Ar-Radisiya
Armant
As-Saff
As-Salihiya
As-Salum
As-Sibiya
As-Simbillawain
Asfun al-Mataina
Ash-Shaikh Fadl
Ash-Shallufa
Ash-Shatt
Ashmun
Assiut
Asyut
At-Tahiya
At-Tina
Atfih
Awlad Elias
Az-Zafarana
Az-Zagaziq

B

Bahtit
Balat
Baltim
Bani Ebeid
Bani Mazar
Bani Suwaif
Banha
Bardawil
Bardis
Baris
Barramiya
Benha
Beni Suef
Berenice
Biba
Bilbais
Bilqas (Bilkas)
Bimban
Bir Abu Hashim
Bir Asal
Bir Ath-Thamad
Bir el-Hamur
Bir Quei
Bir Safaga
Bir Shalatain
Bir Sivala
Bir Umm Gherg
Bir Wasif
Birkat as-Sab
Biyala
Blondie
Brnes
Bulaq
Buqbuq
Bur Fuad
Burj Mughaidhil

C

Cairo

D

Dahab
 Dir Mawas
Dairut
Dalja
Damanhur
Damas
Daraw
Dikarnis
Dishna
Disuq (Disuk)
Dumiat (Damietta)
Dschirdscha

E

Edfu
El-Alamein
El Barod Sharq
El-Bawiti
El-Ferdan
El Ghawaben
El-Gouna
El-Kanayis
El Khasos
El-Kula
El-Laqeita
El Qoseir
El Sahel Bahari
El Shanaina
El Thour
El-Zawya
Elat
Esna
Etiay Al-Baroud

F

Faqus
Faraskur
Faras
Farshut
Fayyum
Fidimiin
Fuka
Fuwa

G

Gharb Mawhub
Ghazal
Ghazi
Gilbana
Girga
Giza
Gogar
Guhaina

H

Hamata
Hammam Faraun
Hawr
Hawsh Isa
Heluan
Higaza
Hurghada

I

Ibshaway
Idfa
Idku
Idmo
Ismailiya
Ismailia
Isnit
Itlidim
Itsa
Izbat Hasan Badr

J

Jabal an-Nur
Jirza
Juhayna

K

Kafr Abu Tirki
Kafr ad-Dawwar
Kafr ash-Seikh
Kafr asch-Schaich
Kafr El Hubi
Kafr Salim
Kafr Shubra Zangi
Kafrat rahma
Kafrat-Zayyat
Kardous
Kawm Hamada
Khanika
Kiman al-Mataina
Kirdasa
Kom Ombo

L
Lagona
Luxor

M

Maghagha
Mahallat Marhum
Maidun
Majres
Mallawi
Mandiska
Manfalut
Manqabad
Marsa Alam
Marsa Matrouh
Marsa Shagra
Masaid
Matay
Minuf
Minya al-Qamb
Mit Ghamr
Monera
Mons Claudianus
Mons Porphyrites
Mut

N

Nadir
Nafisha
Nag Hammadi
Nakhl
Naqada
Nuweiba

O
 Obour

P

Port Said

Q

Qalamun
Qalyub
Qara
Qaret Zumaq
Qasr al-Farafira
Qasr Farafra
Qasr Kharga
Qena
Qina
Qift
Qiman Al-Arus
Qullin
Qus

R

10th of Ramadan
Ramana
Ras al-Hikma
Ras el-Barr
Ras el-Sudr
Ras Gharrib
Ras Jamsah
Rashid

S

Sabdafa
Safaga
Saft El Laban
Salwa al-Bahriya
Samalut
Samanud
San al-Hajar al Qibliya
Sannur
Sauhadsh
Sarabiyum
Satamuni
Sawl
Sendion
Sharm el-Sheikh
Sheikh Shazly
shubra bas
Sherbin
Shibin al-Kawm
Shibin al-Qanatir
Shirbin
Shubra El-Kheima
Sidi Abd ar-Rahman
Sidi Barrani
Sidi Hunaish
Sidi Salim
Sinnuris
Siwa
Sohag
Sumusta al-Waqf
Saqqara
Suqayl

T

Taba
Tabluha
Tahta
Tala
Talcha
Tala, EgyptTalla
Tamiya
Tanta
Tighrinna
Tihna al-Jabal
Tima
Tukh
Tummwah
Tunaida

U

V

W

Wadi Halfa
Warraq Al Hadar
 Wadi Al Natroun

X

Y

Z

Zaitun
Zawiyar at-Tarfaya
Zawiyat Shammas
Zawiyatal-Awwama
Zifta
Zagazig

See also
List of cities in Egypt

References

Egypt
Towns
Egypt